Julieta Serrano Romero (born 2 January 1933 in Barcelona, Catalonia, Spain) is a Spanish theatre and cinema actress. Her prolific career began in the 1960s, and she has worked with directors Pedro Almodóvar and Ventura Pons.

In September 2018 she was awarded by the Premio Nacional de Teatro.

Selected filmography

Secuestro en la ciudad (1965)
El juego de la oca (1966) .... Compañera de Ángela
Crónica de nueve meses (1967) .... Luisa
Forty Degrees in the Shade (1967) .... Dorotea
Laia (1970, Short) .... (voice)
El hombre oculto (1971) .... Clara
Tirarse al monte (1971)
Mi querida señorita (1972) .... Isabelita
Laia (1972) .... Pauline
Marianela (1972) .... La Canela
Zumo (1972, Short)
Abismo (1972, Short)
La prima Angélica (1974) .... Monja
Vera, un cuento cruel (1974) .... María
El amor del capitán Brando (1974) .... María Rosa
Grandeur nature (1974) .... Nicole
Cría Cuervos (1976) .... Ana (voice)
In memoriam (1977)
Carne apaleada (1978) .... Mercedes
Vámonos, Bárbara (1978) .... Paula
Soldados (1978) .... Librera
La familia, bien, gracias (1979) .... Carlota
Cuentos eróticos (1980) .... Gloria (segment "La tilita")
Pepi, Luci, Bom y otras chicas del montón (1980) .... Mujer vestida como Escarlata O'Hara
Yo qué sé (1980, Short)
Cuentos para una escapada (1981)
La mujer del ministro (1981) .... Angelina
Entre tinieblas (1983) .... Superiora
Un genio en apuros (1983) .... Julia
Cuerpo a cuerpo (1984)
El caballero del dragón (1985) .... Dama de compañía
Matador (1986) .... Berta
Tata mía (1986) .... Magda
Iniciativa privada (1986, Short)
El pecador impecable (1987) .... María
Material urbà (1987) .... Mare
Mujeres al borde de un ataque de nervios (1988) .... Lucía
¡Átame! (1990) .... Alma
Monte bajo (1989)
Ho sap el ministre? (1991) .... Carmen
Salsa rosa (1992) .... Mariluz
El Amante Bilingüe (1993) .... Madre de Juan
La febre d'Or (1993) .... Paula Balenyà
Cràpules (1993)
Continuum (1994)
Nexo (1995) .... Vecina
La novia moderna (1995, Short) .... Julieta
Alma gitana (1996) .... Pilar
Un cos al bosc (1996) .... Marieta
La Moños (1996) .... La Moños
La parabólica (1996, Short) .... Vieja
Carícies (1998) .... Dona gran
Cuando vuelvas a mi lado (1999) .... Tía Rafaela
Marta y alrededores (1999)
Nosotras (2000) .... Magdalena
Sagitario (2001) .... Andrónica
Arderás conmigo (2002) .... Irene
Treinta y cinco (2004, Short) .... María
La mirada violeta (2004) .... Madre Violeta
¿Y a mí quién me cuida? (2006, TV Movie) .... Ana
A Tram in SP (2008) .... María
Opération Casablanca (2010) .... Mme Rueda
Mil cretins (2011) .... Hortènsia
La última isla (2012) .... Belinda
Villaviciosa de al lado (2016) .... Petra
The Warning (2018) .... Asunción
Dolor y gloria (2019) .... Jacinta
Parallel Mothers (2021)..... Tía Brígida

Theatre
 Tots eren fills meus
 La casa de Bernarda Alba
 La profesión de la Sra. Warren
 Les alegres casades de Windsor (The Merry Wives of Windsor by William Shakespeare) 
 Espectres (Ghosts by Henrik Ibsen)
 Viaje de un largo día hacia la noche
 Don Juan último
 Orquídeas a la luz de la luna
 Quatre dones i el sol
 Interview de Mrs. Muerta Smith con sus fantasmas
 La senyora de Sade
 Coriolano (Coriolanus by William Shakespeare)
 Antígona entre muros
 Los abrazos del pulpo
 La gata sobre el tejado de zinc (Cat on a Hot Tin Roof by Tennessee Williams)
 Maria Rosa by Àngel Guimerà
 Un hombre es un hombre (Man Equals Man by Bertolt Brecht)
 Motín de brujas by Josep Maria Benet i Jornet
 Veraneantes (Summerfolk by Maxim Gorky). 
 La casa de Bernarda Alba
 La irresistible ascensión del Rey Arturo VI (The Resistible Rise of Arturo Ui by Bertolt Brecht).
 Las criadas
 Las Mocedades del Cid
 El rey Lear (King Lear by William Shakespeare)
 Los melindres de Belisa
 La casa de Bernarda Alba
 Los verdes campos del Edén
 Un mes en el campo 
 El caballero de Olmedo de Lope de Vega
 Un tranvía llamado deseo (A Streetcar Named Desire (play) by Tennessee Williams). 
 La loca de Chaillot 
 Delito en la isla de las Cabras'
 Antígona (Antigone by  Jean Anouilh).

Television
 Temps de silenci.
 Mirall trencat.

References

External links

File at Teatrebcn website

1933 births
Stage actresses from Catalonia
Film actresses from Catalonia
Television actresses from Catalonia
Living people
Chicas Almodóvar
Best Supporting Actress Goya Award winners
20th-century Spanish actresses
21st-century Spanish actresses
Spanish film actresses
Spanish stage actresses